Mann Alive is a live double album released in 1998 by Manfred Mann's Earth Band.

Track listing 
CD1 The Gig
 "Martha's Madman" (Lane Tietgen) – 10:07
 "The Times They Are a-Changin' " (Bob Dylan) – 6:35
 "You Angel You" (Dylan) – 4:11
 "Father of Day, Father of Night" (Dylan) – 10:25
 "For You" (Bruce Springsteen) – 3:44
 "It's A Fine Line" (Manfred Mann, Steve Kinch, John Trotter, Mick Rogers) – 1:32
 "Demolition Man" (Gordon Sumner) – 7:17
 "Nothing Ever Happens" (Justin Currie) – 4:45
 "She Was" (Mann, Kinch, Trotter, Rogers) – 3:40
 "Blinded by the Light" (Springsteen) – 9:00
 "Davy's On The Road Again" (John Simon, Robbie Robertson) – 6:24

CD2 Encore & More
 "I'll Give You" (Mann, Kinch, Trotter, Rogers) – 2:15
 "Shelter from the Storm" (Dylan) – 6:26
 "Redemption Song" (Bob Marley) – 3:36
 "The Mighty Quinn" (Dylan) – 6:59
 "Demolition Man" (Short version) (Sumner) – 3:02
 "Blinded by the Light" (Short version) (Springsteen) – 4:55
 "Redemption Song (Alternate Version)" (Marley) – 3:52
 "Instrumedicine Song" (Mann, Mike Heron) – 4:06
 "Sikelele I" (Traditional; arranged by Mann) – 3:40

Last two tracks taken from the album Plains Music

Personnel 
 Manfred Mann - keyboards, vocals
 Mick Rogers - guitars,  vocals
 John Trotter - drums
 Steve Kinch - bass,  backing vocals
 Noel McCalla - vocals
 Chris Thompson - guitar, vocals

References

Manfred Mann's Earth Band albums
1998 live albums